Nesquik may refer to:

Companies
Nesquik, a brand owned by Nestlé that makes drink mixes, syrups, cereals, chocolate, and other products, established by Nestlé in 1948

Food and drink

 Nesquik (mix), a line of drink-mixes established in 1948, available in Chocolate, Banana, and Strawberry flavours, made by Nesquik, a division of Nestlé
 Nesquik (cereal), a family of Nesquik-branded cereal products
 Nesquik (beverage), a line of Nesquik-branded prepared flavoured milk beverages